The Academy of Finland is a governmental funding body for scientific research in Finland. It is based in Helsinki. Yearly, the Academy administers over 260 million euros to Finnish research activities. Over 5000 researchers are working on projects supported by the academy. The Academy functions as a funding body only and is not a school. However, personnel funded by the Academy can use the title referring to it, e.g. professors will be called akatemiaprofessori. Academy Professor funding has a term of 5 years.

The Academy of Finland should not be confused with the Finnish arts and science school learned societies, The Finnish Academy of Science and Letters (Suomalainen tiedeakatemia) and The Finnish Society of Science and Letters (Finska Vetenskaps-Societeten) which are the two Finnish national honorary academies, for Finnish and Swedish-speaking scientists and scholars, respectively. For engineers, the two language-based honorary academies are Finnish Academy of Technology (Teknillisten Tieteiden Akatemia) and Swedish Academy of Engineering Sciences in Finland (Svenska tekniska veteskapsakademien i Finland).

The Finnish title of Academician (akateemikko / akademiker) is an award given by the President of Finland to the most distinguished Finnish scientists, scholars and artists. It may also be bestowed on foreign scientists, scholars or artists who have contributed very significantly to Finnish intellectual life. At any time, there may be a maximum of 12 living scientific and scholarly academicians and eight living artistic academicians. The number of foreign academicians is not limited. The Academicians do not have any organizational connection to the Academy of Finland, although this was the requisite for membership in 1947–1969.

The president of the academy from 2012 to 2022 is Heikki Mannila.

Academy Professors

Terms
The Academy of Finland appoints Academy Professors. The term is five years. There are 32 serving currently, with two carrying specific name and branch. Minna Canth Academy Professor focuses on Social equality and Women's studies. Martti Ahtisaari Academy Professor focuses on International Conflict management.

Currently serving
Academy Professors in spring 2018:

See also 
 Tekes
 SITRA

References

External links 
 Academy of Finland website in Finnish
 Swedish 
 English 

Science and technology in Finland
Funding bodies
Organisations based in Helsinki
Research funding agencies